Hemibagrus amemiyai is a species of  bagrid catfish found in Howchan in Szechwan Province in China.

References

Ferraris, C.J. Jr., 2007. Checklist of catfishes, recent and fossil (Osteichthyes: Siluriformes), and catalogue of siluriform primary types. Zootaxa 1418:1-628.

Bagridae
Fish of Asia
Fish of China
Fish described in 1934